The General Is Up is a "novel set in modern Africa" by Peter Nazareth. Its story is based on the expulsion of Asians from Idi Amin's Uganda in the 1970s. It is set, in large part, among the expatriate community of Goans, which has had a large number of out-migrants scattered across the globe, including in Uganda, East Africa. It was published by the Calcutta (Kolkata)-based Writer's Workshop in 1984 and re-published by TSAR Publications, Toronto in 1991.

Nazareth is a writer of Goan origin. He was associate professor in Iowa University's Department of English and the Afro-American Studies Program at the time of writing the novel.

Plot
The setting is "Damibia" set in "Africa. To be precise, Central Africa" (p. 21). There, the President-General of the country has just announced that "all the East Indians in the country have to leave by the next moon".

The book focuses on "The General", the Damibia Institute, guerilla attacks, portrayals of inter-racial equations in post-colonial East Africa, playing the game of tombola, a students' demo, a party, David's departure from Africa, the sad farewell at the airport, and more.

References

1991 novels
Ugandan novels
Novels set in Uganda
Cultural depictions of Idi Amin